The 15th Goya Awards were presented in Madrid, Spain on 3 February 2001.

Pellet won the award for Best Film.

Winners and nominees

Major award nominees

Other award nominees

Honorary Goya

References

15
2000 film awards
2000 in Spanish cinema